The Biak lorikeet (Trichoglossus rosenbergii), also known as Rosenberg's lorikeet, is a parrot in the family Psittaculidae. Formerly lumped in with Trichoglossus haematodus, it is endemic to the twin islands of Biak and Superiori in the Papua province of Indonesia.

Habitat
As a newly separated species, specific information is scarce. It is assumed to be similar to other Trichoglossus parakeets in preferring lowland forest including secondary growth and plantations.

Threats
On Biak, forest is under heavy pressure from logging and subsistence farming. Trapping for trade does occur, but how much that affects the species is uncertain. Its population is believed to be decreasing, with fewer than 10,000 mature individuals in the wild.

References

Biak lorikeet
Birds of the Schouten Islands
Biak lorikeet